Riders of the Dawn may refer to:

 Riders of the Dawn (1920 film), American silent western film 
 Riders of the Dawn (1945 film), American western film
 Riders of the Dawn (1990 film), Spanish film